The 2010 Pokka GT Summer Special was the sixth round of the 2010 Super GT season and was the 39th running of the 1000 km Suzuka event, although like 2009, the race was only 700km in length. It took place on August 22, 2010.

Race results
Results are as follows:

Statistics
GT500 Pole Position – #8 ARTA HSV-010 – 1:55.237
GT300 Pole Position – #26 Taisan Porsche – 2:07.498
GT500 Fastest Lap – #23 NISMO GT-R – 1:57.676
GT300 Fastest Lap – #62 R&D Sport Subaru – 2:09.639
Winner's Race Time – 4:07:10.085

References

Pokka GT Summer Special
Suzuka